The Rough Guide to Bhangra is a world music compilation album originally released in 2010. Part of the World Music Network Rough Guides series, the release features bhangra, a form of Punjabi music. Disc One highlights artists from the 1980s to 2000s, and Disc Two features the British band Achanak. The album was compiled by DJ Ritu, a British-born musician, BBC Radio 3 host, and co-founder of Outcaste Records. Brad Haynes coordinated the project, Laurence Cedar mastered the work, and Phil Stanton was the producer. The release was preceded by a first edition a decade earlier.

The album features artists from India, Pakistan, England, and Scotland.

Critical reception
Writing for BBC Music, Vibhuti Patel was dismissive of the album and label in general, calling it "more than a little rough", and the brand responsible for "several entry-level collections of world music" (this being the 202nd release in the series). Patel thought the album should be an historical overview, and lamented the omissions of Gurdas Maan, Malkit Singh, and B21. He also felt Disc Two should have been replaced by another various artist compilation, and wrote that the overall release "falls short of being a definitive introduction" (this is in marked contrast with the first edition, which Ted Swedenburg of PopMatters named "the definitive introduction").

Track listing

Disc One

Disc Two
All tracks on Disc Two are performed by Achanak, a seven-piece British band founded in 1989.

References

External links
 
 

2010 compilation albums
Bhangra